Tenhya is a village and rural commune in Niger. As of 2010, it had a total population of 20,533 people. Tenhya located in the northern Sahel. The neighboring municipalities are Aderbissinat in the northwest, the northeast Tabelot, Tesker to the east and south and Tarka in the west. The rural community of Tenhya was founded in 2002 as an administrative unit. The main ethnic groups are the Fulani subgroup Wodaabe and the Tuareg subgroups Ichiriffen, Imdan, Inesseliman, Kel Ates, Kel Iferwane and Ifoghas, mainly engaged in pastoral farming.

References

Communes of Niger
Zinder Region